Heera Moti is a 1979 Bollywood film directed by Chand and produced by Ratan Mohan. It stars Shatrughan Sinha and Reena Roy.

Cast
Shatrughan Sinha as Vijay / Heera 
Reena Roy as Neelam 
Danny Denzongpa as Ajay / Moti 
Bindu as Julie 
Ajit as Pratap Singh 
Om Shivpuri as Trustee 
Anwar Hussain as Johnny 
Dev Kumar as Sheikh Bin Sheikh 
Narendra Nath as Dracula

Soundtrack
Heera Moti had music by O. P. Nayyar and lyrics by Ahmed Wasi.

External links
 

1979 films
1970s Hindi-language films
Films scored by O. P. Nayyar